Eugoa is a genus in the family Erebidae, subfamily Arctiinae. The genus was erected by Francis Walker in 1858. They are found in India, Sri Lanka, Myanmar and Borneo.

Description
Its palpi are porrect (extending forward) and reach beyond the frons. Antennae of male minutely ciliated. Forewings with veins 6, 7 and 8, 9 stalked. Hindwings with stalked veins 6 and 7 where the vein 8 from middle of cell.

Species
aequalis species group
Eugoa aequalis
Eugoa gabrielae
Eugoa trilacunata
aridoides species group
Eugoa aliquotpunctata
Eugoa apexinigra
Eugoa aridoides
Eugoa bidentata
Eugoa ellipsis
Eugoa gracilisa
Eugoa grandipuncta
Eugoa hectogamoides
Eugoa nata
Eugoa tridens
bipunctalis species group
Eugoa alleni
Eugoa bipunctalis
Eugoa mangle
bipunctata species group
 Eugoa bipunctata
crassa species group
Eugoa alticrassa
Eugoa crassa
holocraspedon species group
Eugoa cesaneki
Eugoa holocraspedon
humerana species group
Eugoa humerana
inconspicua species group
Eugoa bipuncta
Eugoa inconspicua
Eugoa muluana
indeclaratana species group
Eugoa apiensis
Eugoa indeclaratana
Eugoa uniformis
obliquipuncta species group
Eugoa obliquipuncta
okalii species group
Eugoa okalii
palawanica species group
Eugoa palawanica
parva species group
Eugoa parva
pectinicrassa species group
Eugoa pectinicrassa
simonae species group
Eugoa simonae
submontana species group
Eugoa submontana
tessellata species group
Eugoa tessellata
trifasciata species group
Eugoa khmera
Eugoa malayicola
Eugoa pulchra
Eugoa trifasciata
turbida species group
Eugoa turbida
unicolora species group
Eugoa unicolora
vagigutta species group
Eugoa vagigutta
other species
Eugoa africana
Eugoa arcuata
Eugoa arida
Eugoa bacchi
Eugoa basipuncta

Eugoa brunnea
Eugoa clavata
Eugoa conflua
Eugoa corniculata Kühne, 2007
Eugoa coronaria Kühne, 2007
Eugoa costiplaga
Eugoa cucullata
Eugoa dissozona
Eugoa eeckei
Eugoa euryphaea
Eugoa fasciata
Eugoa gemina
Eugoa grisea
Eugoa hampsoni
Eugoa immunda
Eugoa incerta
Eugoa mindanensis
Eugoa perfasciata
Eugoa pulverosa
Eugoa quadriplagiata
Eugoa rufibasis
Eugoa sexpuncta
Eugoa sinuata
Eugoa sordida
Eugoa tineoides
Eugoa tricolora
Eugoa trifascia
Eugoa trifasciata
Eugoa trifasciella
Eugoa tropicalis
Eugoa vasta
Eugoa winneba Kühne, 2007

References

 Kühne, L. (2007). Esperiana Buchreihe zur Entomologie Memoir 3: 353–394.
 , 2008, Contribution to the knowledge of the genus Eugoa Walker, 1858 (Lepidoptera: Arctiidae: Lithosiinae), Entomofauna 29 (26): 417–468.

External links
 

 
Lithosiini
Moth genera